Princess Elisabeth of Prussia (8 February 1857 – 28 August 1895) was a German princess. She was the second child of Prince Frederick Charles of Prussia and Princess Maria Anna of Anhalt-Dessau. The Elisabeth-Anna-Palais was named in her honor after her early death in 1895.

Family
Elisabeth's father Prince Frederick was the eldest son of Prince Charles of Prussia, who in turn was a younger son of Frederick William III of Prussia. Elisabeth's mother Maria Anna was a daughter of Leopold IV, Duke of Anhalt and Princess Frederica Wilhelmina of Prussia.

Her siblings included Marie, Princess of Saxe-Altenburg, Louise Margaret, Duchess of Connaught and Strathearn, and Prince Friedrich Leopold of Prussia. Through her sister Louise Margaret, Elisabeth Anna was an aunt of Margaret, Crown Princess of Sweden, and consequently was related to both the British and Swedish royal families.

Elisabeth Anna was a godmother to Princess Patricia of Connaught, who was another one of her nieces.

Marriage
On 18 February 1878, Elisabeth Anna married Frederick Augustus, Hereditary Grand Duke of Oldenburg. It was a double wedding, in which Princess Charlotte of Prussia (daughter of the Crown Prince and Crown Princess of Prussia) married Bernhard, Hereditary Prince of Saxe-Meiningen on the same day as Elisabeth Anna in Berlin. The marriages were the first such occasions performed since Prussia had become the German Empire in 1870. Due to this increased status, the weddings were attended by many important personages, including King Leopold II of the Belgians and his wife Queen Marie Henriette. The Prince of Wales also attended, as one of the brides (Charlotte) was his niece. Frederick Augustus was said to be pleased with his beautiful and charming bride, and their marriage was a harmonious one.

Elisabeth Anna and her husband had two daughters:

Elisabeth died on 28 August 1895, before he succeeded as Grand Duke. Before her death, her husband had been building a new residential palace; once she died, Frederick named the new building the Elisabeth-Anna-Palais in her honor. Her husband later married Elisabeth Alexandrine of Mecklenburg-Schwerin, daughter of Frederick Francis II, Grand Duke of Mecklenburg.

Ancestry

References

Sources

1857 births
1895 deaths
People from Potsdam
Prussian princesses
Grand Duchesses of Oldenburg
House of Hohenzollern
Burials at the Ducal Mausoleum, Gertrudenfriedhof (Oldenburg)